The 2024 Missouri Attorney General election will be held on November 5, 2024, to elect the attorney general of the state of Missouri. It will coincide with the concurrent presidential election, as well as various state and local elections, including for U.S. Senate, U.S. House, and governor of Missouri.

When incumbent attorney general Eric Schmitt was elected to the U.S. Senate in 2022, Missouri governor Mike Parson announced that he would appoint his general counsel, Andrew Bailey, to succeed Schmitt. Bailey is running for a full term in office.

Republican primary

Candidates

Declared 
 Andrew Bailey, acting attorney general
 Will Scharf, former assistant U.S. Attorney

Potential 
 Timothy Garrison, former U.S. Attorney for the Western District of Missouri
 Tony Luetkemeyer, state senator from the 34th district and nephew of U.S. Representative Blaine Luetkemeyer
 Dean Plocher, state representative from the 89th district
 John Wood, former senior counsel for the January 6th Committee, former U.S. Attorney for the Western District of Missouri, and independent candidate for U.S. Senate in 2022

Endorsements

Democratic primary

Declared 
 Elad Gross, civil rights attorney, former assistant attorney general, and candidate for attorney general in 2020
 Sarah Unsicker, state representative from the 83rd district

References 

Attorney General
Missouri
Missouri Attorney General elections